Gustave Brion (1824–1877) was a French painter and illustrator. He was born at Rothau in the department of Bas-Rhin on 24 October 1824. In 1841, in Strasbourg, he entered the studio of Gabriel Guérin, with whom he remained three years; he also received tuition from Andreas Friedrich, the sculptor; but he soon afterwards went to Paris, where his first work appeared at the Salon in 1847; it was entitled Interior of a Farm at Dambach. Six years later he gained a medal of the second class for his 'Schlitteurs de la Foret-Noire' and the Potato Harvest during an Inundation, the former of which was subsequently burned at Strassburg by the Prussians. His fame was further established by his Le Train de Bois sur le Rhin in 1855, and from that time his works continued to increase in public favour, and gained considerable praise and recompense for their author. Brion received numerous medals in 1853, 1863, 1867, 1868, &c., and the decoration of the Legion of Honour in 1863. He died in Paris 3 November 1877.

With few exceptions, such as the 'Siege of a Town by Romans under Julius Caesar, painted on commission for Napoleon III, and at the cost of much research to the artist, Brion rarely indulged in historical subjects. He delighted to represent peasants in their natural avocations: here they gather in their potatoes or chat by the village well; there they conduct barges laden with wood down the river; now we see them at a marriage, now hearing mass or attending a burial. Putting aside several subjects drawn from Normandy and Brittany, from the Basque Provinces, and from a stay in Italy, Brion remained true to his love of
Alsace, and it is of the doings of her peasantry that he tells us in his paintings.

Brion also worked as a book illustrator. His most famous designs are those for the first edition of Victor Hugo's novel Les Misérables, for which he created the first portrayal of Inspector Javert. He also illustrated Hugo's The Hunchback of Notre-Dame, in which he depicted Quasimodo and Esmeralda.

Brion was a nephew of the legendary Friederike Brion.

Principal works
The following are his principal works:

Interior of a Farm at Dambaoh, Salon, 1847
 'Schlitteurs' of the Black Forest, Salon, 1853
Potato Harvest during an Inundation, Salon, 1852
Wood-Barge on the Rhine (engraved by Jazet),  Paris Exhibition, 1855
Burial in the Vosges, the same
La Fête-Dieu, the same
The Miraculous Well, the same
Mountebank in the Middle Ages, Salon, 1857
Gathering Potatoes (in the Nantes Museum), Salon, 1857
A Church Porch, Salon, 1859
Burial on the Rhine, same
The Skittle-Players, same
A Protestant Marriage in Alsace (etched by Rajon), Salon, 1861
The Wedding Feast (etched by Bellin), same
The Blessing, London Exhibition, 1862
The Pilgrims of St. Odile, Salon, 1863
The End of the Deluge, Salon, 1864
 La Quète au Loup, sameReading the Bible in Alsace, Salon, 1868A Wedding in Alsace, Salon, 1874 (earlier drawing of the same image pictured)First Steps, Salon 1876The Réveil, Encampment of Pilgrims, Salon, 1877

Brion also created more than 200 illustrations for Victor Hugo's Les Misérables  and more for The Hunchback of Notre-Dame'' (see 'Flemish and French Pictures,' by F. G. Stephens).

ReferencesAttribution:'''
 

1824 births
1877 deaths
People from Bas-Rhin
19th-century French painters
French male painters
Chevaliers of the Légion d'honneur
Painters from Alsace
19th-century French male artists